The 1908 St Austell by-election was held on 5 February 1908.  The by-election was held due to the resignation of the incumbent Liberal MP, William Alexander McArthur.  It was won by the Liberal candidate Thomas Agar-Robartes, who was unopposed.

References

St Austell by-election
St Austell by-election
St Austell by-election
By-elections to the Parliament of the United Kingdom in Cornish constituencies
Unopposed by-elections to the Parliament of the United Kingdom (need citation)
St Austell
1900s in Cornwall